Artsyom Hancharyk (born 13 April 1980) is a Belarusian former footballer.

Career

Hancharyk started his career with Smena-BATE Minsk.

Honours
BATE Borisov
Belarusian Premier League champion: 1999, 2002

Shakhtyor Soligorsk
Belarusian Premier League champion: 2005
Belarusian Cup: 2003–04

References

External links

1980 births
Living people
Belarusian footballers
Association football forwards
FC Smena Minsk players
FC BATE Borisov players
FC Shakhtyor Soligorsk players
FC Gomel players
FC Neman Grodno players
FC Belshina Bobruisk players
FC Vitebsk players
FC Granit Mikashevichi players
FC Partizan Minsk players
FC Molodechno players
Belarus under-21 international footballers
Footballers from Minsk